The 1984–85 Scottish League Cup final was played on 28 October 1984, at Hampden Park in Glasgow and was the final of the 39th Scottish League Cup. The final was contested by Rangers and Dundee United. Rangers won the match 1–0 thanks to an Iain Ferguson goal.

Match details

1984
League Cup Final
Scottish League Cup Final 1984
Scottish League Cup Final 1984
1980s in Glasgow
October 1984 sports events in the United Kingdom